Clifford Snook (24 September 1924 – 9 October 2013) was a New Zealand cricketer. He played in five first-class matches for Canterbury from 1947 to 1950.

See also
 List of Canterbury representative cricketers

References

External links
 

1924 births
2013 deaths
New Zealand cricketers
Canterbury cricketers
Cricketers from Christchurch